Como Chamling is a saline lake in eastern Dinggyê County, Tibet Autonomous Region, China, on the Tibetan Plateau. Most of this fluctuation occurs at the eastern end of the lake. To the north of the lake is both natural pastures and farmland.

References

Lakes of Tibet